Jaruge is a village in Croatia. The population is 738.

Populated places in Brod-Posavina County